Chung Hua University (CHU) is a private university located in Xiangshan District, Hsinchu City, Taiwan. It was formerly known as Chung Hua Polytechnic Institute founded in 1990 by three local Hsinchu entrepreneurs, Ron-Chang Wang, Zau-Juang Tsai and Lin Junq-tzer. It was upgraded to university status and renamed as "Chung Hua University" in 1997. There are six colleges with 25 departments offering undergraduate courses as well as 16 master programs and 3 PH.D. programs. CHU is accredited by AACSB.

Organization 
 College of Engineering
 Department of Electronics Engineering
 Department of Civil Engineering and Engineering Informatics
 Department of Mechanical Engineering
 Department of Applied Mathematics
 Department of Communications Engineering
 Department of Microelectronics Engineering
 Degree Program of Photonics and Materials Science
 Institute of Engineering and Science
 Institute of Environmental Resource and Energy in Science and Technology
 Institute of Mechanical and Aerospace Engineering
 College of Management
 Department of Industrial Engineering and System Management
 Department and Institute of Technology Management
 Department and Institute of Business Administration
 Department of Financial Management
 Department of Transportation Technology and Logistics Management
 Department of International Business
 College of Architecture and Planning
 Department of Architecture and Urban Planning
 Department of Landscape Architecture
 Department of Construction Engineering & Project Management
 Institute of Construction Management
 College of Humanities and Social Science
 Department of Foreign Languages and Literature
 Department and Institute of Public Administration
 Centre of General Education
 Centre of Teacher Education
 College of Computer Science and Information
 Department of Computer Science and Information Engineering
 Department of Information Management
 Department of Bioinfomatics
 Degree Program of Computer Science & Information
 College of Tourism
 Department of Hotel & Restaurant Management
 Department of Leisure and Recreational Management
 Degree Program of Tourism and MICE Management

Notable alumni
 Hsu Ming-tsai, Mayor of Hsinchu City (2009–2014)
 Hsu Yao-chang, Magistrate of Miaoli County
 Lin Chih-chien, Mayor of Hsinchu City
 Lu Chia-chen, member of Legislative Yuan (2008-2016)
 Chang Ching-chung, legislator
 Yen Kuan-heng, legislator
 Chantel Liu, actor
 Edison Lin, singer

See also
 List of universities in Taiwan

References

External links

 
School paper of CHU
Map of Campus

1990 establishments in Taiwan
Educational institutions established in 1990
Universities and colleges in Hsinchu
Universities and colleges in Taiwan
Comprehensive universities in Taiwan